Odette de Mourgues (1914-1988) was a noted Cambridge based literary scholar. The early inspiration for her work was Henri Fluchere but at the University of Cambridge it was F. R. Leavis.

Selected publications
de Mourgues, O. (1953). Metaphysical Baroque and Précieux Poetry, by Odette de Mourgues,... Clarendon Press.
de Mourgues, O. (1967). Autonomie de Racine. FeniXX.

References

1914 births
1988 deaths
Alumni of Girton College, Cambridge
French literary critics
Women literary critics
French women critics